Leslie Claude Hunkin (10 January 1884 – 8 September 1984) was an Australian politician who represented the South Australian House of Assembly multi-member seat of East Torrens from 1921 to 1927 for the Labor Party.

References

1884 births
1984 deaths
Members of the South Australian House of Assembly
20th-century Australian politicians
Australian centenarians
Men centenarians